Melocarpum is a genus of flowering plants belonging to the family Zygophyllaceae.

Its native range is Northeastern Tropical Africa, Southern Arabian Peninsula.

Species:

Melocarpum hildebrandtii 
Melocarpum robecchii

References

Zygophyllaceae
Rosid genera